Parvizdzhon Abdulloyevich Umarbayev ((), born 1 November 1994) is a Tajikistani professional footballer who plays as a midfielder for CSKA 1948 and the Tajikistan national team. He also holds Russian citizenship.

Career
On 26 September 2012, Umarbayev made his debut for FC Rubin Kazan in their 2012–13 Russian Cup game against FC Yenisey Krasnoyarsk.

In March 2015, Umarbayev signed for Tajik League champions FC Istiklol.

In June 2016, Umarbayev moved to Bulgarian First League side Lokomotiv Plovdiv on a two-year contract. He left the team after 6 seasons becoming one of the most capped foreign players for the club.

After several months of speculations, on 23 July 2022 Umarbayev officially signed a contract with CSKA 1948.

International career
With Russian citizenship was summoned to the youth team of Russia in 2012.

He played for the youth team of Tajikistan (under 23 years) from 2015 debut on March 27 in a match against Yemen. March 31, 2015 scored his first goal in a match against Sri Lanka (5:1).

In May 2015 he was called up to the Tajikistan national football team.

Career statistics

Club

International

Statistics accurate as of match played 11 June 2022

International goals
Scores and results list Tajikistan's goal tally first.

Honours

Istiklol
Tajik League: 2015
Tajik Cup: 2015
Tajik Supercup: 2015, 2016

Lokomotiv Plovdiv
 Bulgarian Cup: 2018–19, 2019–20
 Bulgarian Supercup: 2020

References

External links
 

1994 births
Living people
People from Khujand
Tajikistani footballers
Tajikistan international footballers
Russian footballers
Russia youth international footballers
Tajikistani emigrants to Russia
FC Rubin Kazan players
FC Istiklol players
PFC Lokomotiv Plovdiv players
First Professional Football League (Bulgaria) players
Expatriate footballers in Bulgaria
Association football midfielders
FC Neftekhimik Nizhnekamsk players
FC Khimik Dzerzhinsk players